Sanjay M. Khanduri Devanagari: संजय खंडूरी), is a film director from Bollywood, best known for direction of the cult classic independent movie Ek Chalis Ki Last Local .

Early life
Khanduri is an Indian Filmmaker, Screenwriter who is known for his novel cinematic style and unique screenplay executions. Born in a Hindu affluent family, he hails originally from majestic hills of Uttarakhand. He was brought up in New Delhi and attended Blue Bells International School. Khanduri later graduated from Delhi University, with a qualification in Electronics. Geared up to be an Engineer, Khanduri found his passion for media and left all his plans behind to intensively join journalism, ad-films to finally become a filmmaker. 

He started his career with prominent news channel TV18, as an investigative correspondent. Bearing a deep passion for special effects, he eventually arrived at the top VFX company, Crest Communication in Mumbai city. It was during this period he developed an interest in filmmaking and his first breakthrough came as second assistant Director with prolific filmmaker Subhash Ghai in the movie Taal. His second movie was with auteur filmmaker Kundan Shah on the film Dil Hai Tumhara as a Chief Associate Director.
Film Career
Khanduri debuted in Bollywood with a sleeper hit Ek Chalis Ki Last Local, an independent low budget one night roller coaster. Besides Director he was also the screenwriter of the film. The film was produced by Quartet Films which was later presented by Bharat Shah. The movie stars Abhay Deol & Neha Dhupia along with Nawazuddin Siddiqui in the lead role and 80% new cast. The film though a small release went on to garner accolades and became a DVD cult with youngsters. His second film Kismat Love Paisa Dilli a pacy one night satire on corruption featured Vivek Oberoi, Malika Sherawat and Ashutosh Rana in lead roles. The film got an average response at the box office due to release issues but Khanduri received international awards for its unique screenplay and direction. Khanduri was also Special Episodes Director for "GUMRAH" a youth based crime series and Second Director on the popular web show "HOSTAGES" starring Ronit Roy and Tisca Chopra.

 Filmography Ek Chalis Ki Last Local (2007)Kismat Love Paisa Dilli (2012)

Career
Arriving with his dark comic thriller Ek Chalis Ki Last Local'' (meaning: The Last Local Train of 1:40 am), Sanjay Khanduri marks his presence in the Hindi independent cinema, as a writer and director reflecting his unique potential. The film won high accolades from masses and critics for its innovative concept and screenplay. The film encapsulates the protagonist's bizarre night journey after missing his train till catching another 2.5 hours later, in 2.5 hours of screen time. His second film Kismat Love Paisa Dilli received international recognition, but did not fare that well in the country. 

Khandduri is now making a biopic on a martyr of the 1962 Indo-China war, in support with the Indian Army for Abundantia Entertainment.

Awards 
 "2010: Winner of 'Silver Palm Award' For 'Excellence in Cinema' at Mexico International Film Festival for his debut film Ek Chalis Ki Last Local.
 "Lion's best debutant director award" for his first Hindi commercial film in India Ek Chalis Ki Last Local.
Nominations :

 4 Stardust Nominations : Best Debutant Director; Best Film; Best supporting Actress: Sunita Rajwar; Best supporting Actor : Ashoka Samarth

 " 2013 : The Golden Palm for Best Director in Mexico International Film Festival for his film Kismat Love Paisa Dilli'
 " 2013 : Chosen for screening in 17th Annual Vancouver International Asian Film Festival in Vancouver, BC for his film 'Kismat Love Paisa Dilli'
 " 2014  : Awarded medal of honour for 'Original Screenplay' for his film 'Kismet Love Paisa Dilli'.

References 

 Best Info-media
Sanjay Khanduri - About This Person

External links
 
 New York Film Festival 2014

Hindi-language film directors
Living people
1979 births
Film directors from Delhi
Delhi University alumni